Carbonic anhydrase 5B, mitochondrial is an enzyme that in humans is encoded by the CA5B gene.

Carbonic anhydrases (CAs) are a large family of zinc metalloenzymes that catalyze the reversible hydration of carbon dioxide.  They participate in a variety of biological processes, including respiration, calcification, acid-base balance, bone resorption, and the formation of aqueous humor, cerebrospinal fluid, saliva, and gastric acid.  They show extensive diversity in tissue distribution and in their subcellular localization.  CA VB is localized in the mitochondria and shows the highest sequence similarity to the other mitochondrial CA, CA VA.  It has a wider tissue distribution than CA VA, which is restricted to the liver.  The differences in tissue distribution suggest that the two mitochondrial carbonic anhydrases evolved to assume different physiologic roles.

References

External links

Further reading

 no open